The Élan class was a class of French minesweeping sloops (Avisos dragueur de mines). Originally designed as minesweepers, they were never used in that role, instead being used mostly as escort vessels. Built between 1936 and 1940, the first came into service just before the outbreak of World War II.

Description
The class was powered by two Sulzer diesel engines rated at  driving two shafts.

As designed the Élan class were intended to be armed with twin-mounted /45 calibre guns, one quad  anti-aircraft (AA) gun mount and two twin-mounted 13.2 mm/76 AA mounts. However, no twin 100 mm mounts were available when the sloops were completed and the Élan class were armed with either a single 100 mm Mle 1892 gun or a twin  mount. The vessels were designed for minesweeping, though never saw service in that capacity. The class later received two depth charge throwers and one depth charge rack. The vessels had a complement of 88 in peacetime and maximum 106 during war.

Modifications
Between 1941 and 1942 three of the ships — La Moquese, Commandant Duboc and Commandant Dominé — were rearmed by the British. Their main armament was replaced by twin quick-firing gun (QF)  guns, while La Moqueuse was also fitted with a single QF /40 Mk I high-angle gun. All three also received a single QF 2-pounder pom-pom gun. They retained their original twin 13.2 mm/76 AA guns, while two ships received additional guns of various calibres. Commandant Duboc gained a single /60 M1938 and two /70 Oerlikon cannon, while Commandant Dominé had an additional four twin and two single /62 machine guns. In 1947 Commandant Dominé was rearmed again with a single German /45 calibre SK C/32 gun as main armament, a single Bofors /60 Mk.3 and four single 20 mm/70 Mk.2 Oerlikons guns.

Ships in class

Service history
After the fall of France in June 1940, four of the class were in British ports after taking part in the Dunkirk evacuation, and were seized by the British. Three — Commandant Duboc, Commandant Dominé, and La Moqueuse — subsequently served in the Free French Naval Forces (FNFL), while La Capricieuse remained in British service until the end of the war.

The remaining ships remained under the control of Vichy France. Four — Élan, Commandant Delage, La Boudeuse and La Gracieuse — were based in French Morocco. Élan was interned in Turkey from June 1941 until released in December 1944 to serve with the FNFL. The others were captured by the Allies after the invasion of North Africa in November 1942, and were turned over to the FNFL.

Five of the class were based at Toulon. After the German occupation of southern France in November 1942, one ship  — Commandant Bory — joined the FNFL. Commandant Rivière and  La Batailleuse were captured by the Germans at Bizerte and transferred to Italy, while two — L'Impétueuse  and La Curieuse — were scuttled by their crews, along with the rest of the French Fleet, but later salvaged and also transferred to Italy. One was sunk in Italian service, and after the Italian armistice, the remaining three were taken over by the Germans, and later scuttled.

The nine ships of the class that survived the war remained in French Navy service until scrapped between 1953 and 1963.

Ships
  (A19/F748)Built at the Arsenal de Lorient, the ship was laid down in August 1936, launched on 27 July 1938 and commissioned in 1939. From mid-1940 she was under the control of Vichy France and based in French Morocco. She was sent to reinforce the Naval Division of the Levant at Beirut, going to internment in Turkey from June 1941 until she was released in December 1944 to serve with Free French Naval Forces (FNFL). She remained in service with the French Navy until decommissioned on 26 March 1958, and was then sold and scrapped.

 La Batailleuse
Built at the Ateliers et Chantiers de Provence, Port-de-Bouc, the ship was laid down in December 1937, launched on 22 August 1939 and commissioned in March 1940. From June 1940 she was under the control of Vichy France. On 8 December 1942 she was captured by the Germans, transferred to Italy, reclassified as a corvette and renamed FR51. After the Italian armistice she was scuttled by the Germans on 9 September 1943 at La Spezia. She was raised by the Germans and returned to service as SG23, and then renamed Uj2231. On 15 April 1945 she was scuttled at Genoa.

 La Boudeuse (A18/F744)Built at the Ateliers et Chantiers de France, Dunkirk, the ship was laid down in March 1938, launched on 10 February 1940 and commissioned in May 1940. In May 1940 she took part in the Dunkirk evacuation. From 25 June 1940 she was under the control of Vichy France, based in French Morocco. Captured by the Allies during invasion of North Africa in November 1942, she joined the FNFL on 1 December 1942. She remained in service with the French Navy until decommissioned on 15 April 1958, sold and scrapped.

  (A16/F745)Built at the Ateliers et Chantiers Dubigeon, Nantes, the ship was laid down in January 1938, launched on 19 April 1939 and commissioned in February 1940. She was seized by the British on 3 July 1940 and returned to France on 6 June 1945. She was scrapped in September 1964.

 Commandant Bory (A11/F740)Built at the Ateliers et Chantiers de France, Dunkirk, the ship was laid down in November 1936, launched on 26 January 1939 and commissioned in September 1939. From 25 June 1940 she was under the control of Vichy France. In November 1942 she joined the FNFL. She remained in service with the French Navy until decommissioned on 17 February 1953, and then sold and scrapped.

 Commandant Delage (A12/F741)Built at the Ateliers et Chantiers de France, Dunkirk, the ship was laid down in November 1936, launched on 25 February 1939 and commissioned in December 1939. In May 1940 she took part in the Dunkirk evacuation. From 25 June 1940 she was under the control of Vichy France, based in French Morocco. Captured by the Allies during the invasion of North Africa in November 1942, she joined the FNFL. She remained in service with the French Navy until decommissioned on 18 October 1960, sold and scrapped.

  (U70/A15/F742)Built at the Ateliers et Chantiers Dubigeon, Nantes, the ship was laid down in February 1938, launched on 2 May 1939 and commissioned in April 1940. She was seized by the British on 3 July 1940 and transferred to the FNFL. She remained in service with the French Navy until decommissioned on 18 August 1960. She was scrapped in October 1960.

 Commandant Duboc (U41/A17/F743)Built at the Ateliers et Chantiers Dubigeon, Nantes, the ship was laid down in December 1936, launched on 16 January 1939 and commissioned in August 1939. In May 1940 she took part in the Dunkirk evacuation, and in July was seized by the British and transferred to the FNFL. In March 1941 she took part in operations in the Red Sea. She remained in service with the French Navy until July 1963, when she was sold and scrapped.

 Commandant Rivière
Built at the Ateliers et Chantiers de Provence, Port-de-Bouc, the ship was laid down in November 1936, launched on 16 February 1939 and commissioned in September 1939. In May 1940 she took part in the Dunkirk evacuation. From  June 1940 she was under the control of Vichy France. On 8 December 1942 she was captured by the Germans, transferred to Italy, reclassified as a corvette and renamed FR52. On 28 May 1943 Allied aircraft bombed and sank her at Livorno. She was scrapped starting on 9 September 1946.

 La Curieuse
Built at the Arsenal de Lorient, the ship was laid down in August 1938, launched on 11 November 1939 and commissioned in 1940. On 16 June 1940, during the Italian invasion of France, she sank the Italian  Provana off Oran. Under the control of Vichy France and based at Toulon, she was scuttled on 27 November 1942. She was refloated on 6 April 1943, transferred to Italy, reclassified as a corvette, and renamed FR55. After the Italian armistice she came under German control, was renamed SG25 and returned to Toulon, where she was scuttled again in August 1944 during the Allied invasion of southern France.

 La Gracieuse (A14/F746)Built at the Ateliers et Chantiers de Provence, Port-de-Bouc, the ship was laid down in February 1938, launched on 30 November 1939 and commissioned in May 1940. From 30 June 1940 she was under the control of Vichy France, based in French Morocco. Captured by the Allies during the invasion of North Africa in November 1942, she joined the FNFL on 1 December 1942. She remained in service with the French Navy until decommissioned on 11 September 1958, sold and scrapped.

 L'Impétueuse
Built at the Ateliers et Chantiers de France, Dunkirk, the ship was laid down in April 1938, launched on 15 January 1940 and commissioned in May 1940. In May 1940 she took part in the Dunkirk evacuation. From  June 1940 she was under the control of Vichy France, based at Toulon, where she was scuttled on 27 November 1942. She was refloated in 1943, transferred to Italy, reclassified as a corvette, and renamed FR54. After the Italian armistice was declared on 8 September 1943 she came under German control, returned to Toulon, and was scuttled at Marseilles on 7 August 1944 just before the Allied invasion of southern France.

 La Moqueuse (U17/A13/F747)
Built at the Arsenal de Lorient, the ship was laid down in September 1938, launched on 25 January 1940 and commissioned in April 1940. She was seized by the British on 3 July 1940, and transferred to the FNFL. She was scrapped in October 1965.

Notes

Citations

Bibliography

Mine warfare vessel classes
 
Ship classes of the French Navy